St Andrew's Cathedral School is a multi-campus independent Anglican co-educational comprehensive and specialist primary and secondary day school, located in the Sydney central business district, New South Wales, Australia. The school currently caters for approximately 1450 students from Kindergarten to Year 12.

The School is one of Sydney's oldest, founded in 1885, as a choir school for St Andrew's Cathedral, Sydney. St Andrew's is legally supervised by the Cathedral Chapter which appoints and approves members of the School Council which was formed in 1979. The council is responsible for administering the School's policies and formulating its mission and vision as well as appointing successive Heads of School. A boys' school for much of its history, St Andrew's opened its doors to senior girls (Year 10 to Year 12) in 1999. In 2008, the school became a fully co-educational school with boys and girls enrolled from Kindergarten to Year 12. In addition to providing a comprehensive education and a specialist choir school, the School operates an Indigenous primary school, called Gawura.

The School is a member of the International Choir Schools' Association, the Independent Schools Association (ISA), the Association of Heads of Independent Schools of Australia (AHISA), and the Junior School Heads Association of Australia (JSHAA).

In 2009, St Andrew's became an IB World School and commenced offering the International Baccalaureate Diploma as an alternative leaving qualification to the NSW Higher School Certificate (HSC).

First 90 years 

St Andrew's Cathedral School was founded by the third Bishop of Sydney, Metropolitan of New South Wales and Primate of Australia Alfred Barry. The school was opened as the St Andrew's Schoolroom on 14 July 1885 in the Old Baptist Church premises in Pitt Street, on the corner of Bathurst and Kent Streets, Sydney. At the school opening, Bishop Barry stated that St Andrew's was established to provide "the choristers with a high-class, free education on Church principles, in addition to a musical training".  The school started with 27 boys, of whom 22 were choristers and, although it was later nicknamed the "Choir School", provision was made for non-choristers to attend. Enrolments reached a total of 80 in 1892, but suddenly dropped to about 50 and remained at this number for many years.

St. Andrew's Church in Pitt Street (now Stafford House) was the next home of the school, and remained so from 1892 to 1914, when it was moved to St. Phillip's Parish Hall, Church Hill (No. 1 York Street, Sydney).

The school made several subsequent moves, to the old Deanery (Church House) in 1917 and to the adjacent Worker newspaper printing works building in 1937. In 1961 the Cathedral Chapter and Standing Committee, after years of deliberation, decided to commence Stage One of a vast master plan to redevelop the Cathedral Site. As a result, Stage One of the "New School" was built along Kent Street, from the Bathurst Street corner and integrated with the adjoining old Worker Building.

That building lasted only eight school years from 1965 to 1972.  There followed three-and-a-half years, from 1973 to August 1976, during which it was housed temporarily in the CENEF Building diagonally opposite across Bathurst and Kent Streets.

Modern establishment
On 13 August 1976 St. Andrew's Cathedral School returned to its previous site and occupied the sixth, seventh and eighth floors, and rooftop of the newly constructed St. Andrew's House, where it remains. The school has its own entrance off Kent Street and a dedicated lift to levels 4, 5, 6, 7 and 8.

The school commenced outdoor education in 1982 using hired properties. During 1984, the school purchased a  rural property at Penrose, near Moss Vale in the NSW Southern Highlands for its own outdoor education campus.

In 1991, the school established a senior secondary learning centre at 51 Druitt Street, Sydney, in close proximity to St Andrew's House. The Premier of NSW, Nick Greiner, officially opened the Bishop Barry Senior Secondary Centre.  In 1997, the School Council decided that St Andrew's students would be better prepared for post-school work, study and lifestyle choices if the school became co-educational in Years 10, 11 and 12. Accordingly, in Term 1, 1999, the first 76 girls commenced in the Senior College. St Andrew's became the only co-educational school in the city.

In 1999, the school's Student Business Club formed a working partnership with the Sydney 2000 Paralympics Organising Committee (SPOC) to raise awareness of the Games. The students conducted a range of events over a two-year period that ultimately raised $100,000 to help stage the Sydney 2000 Paralympic Games.

In 2001, the school negotiated long-term occupancy in St Andrew's House by signing a 120-year lease for its facilities.

Canon Melville Cooper Newth , the eleventh and longest-serving Headmaster of St Andrew's Cathedral School (1941-1979), died on 21 October 2004, aged 90. The MC Newth Auditorium was named in his honour.

The school marked its 120th year in 2005. At the same time, Phillip Heath celebrated his 10-year anniversary as the Head of School. This year also saw the School Council confirm the decision to vacate the Leadership and Enterprise Centre at 495 Kent Street. The main campus remains within the eight-storey St Andrew's House, located at 474 Kent Street.

On 22 September 2006, a new entrance to the school was opened by former Archbishop of Sydney, Sir Marcus Loane . This was attended by the Lord Mayor of Sydney, Clover Moore, as well as many parents and friends of students. The contemporary entrance is directly opposite the west door to St Andrew's Cathedral in Sydney Square. The school's address subsequently changed from 474 Kent Street, Sydney to Sydney Square, Sydney. In 2008, the school successfully negotiated a lease with the Wentworth Park Stadium Trust to allow the School to use the Wentworth Park sporting fields and stadium. The lease also includes the exclusive use of a three-storey building on the eastern side of the field and change rooms on the western side. These lease arrangements are ongoing. On 20 November 2008, it was announced that the Head of School, Phillip Heath, after 14 years in the position, would depart the school to take up the principalship of Radford College, Canberra, effective from 1 July 2009. Dr John Collier, Head of St Paul's Grammar School for 12 years, was announced as his replacement on 4 June 2009, and commenced the position in Term 1, 2010.

Co-education 
In Term 1, 1999 the school introduced the first girls into the senior college, and 76 girls entered into Years 10, 11 and 12.

During the 2006 Speech Night, the school revealed a plan to introduce full co-educational years from Kindergarten through to Year 12 in 2008. In 2006, the youngest female student was enrolled in Year 8, and graduated with the Class of 2010. During 2007, 10 girls were enrolled into the middle school (Years 7 to 9) and the school introduced twin classes (single-sex classes) in those years for the key subjects of English, Mathematics and Science. All other subjects, including sport, and in all other years of the school, are taught in a co-educational environment. St Andrew's was the first independent school in New South Wales to choose this twinning model in a coeducation environment.

Visits by British royalty 
Royals have attended services at the cathedral on numerous occasions, on all of which the school's choristers have sung and had the opportunity of meeting them:

 1920 - 13 June, Edward, Prince of Wales
 1927 - May, Prince Albert, Duke of York, and Duchess of York
 1945 - 11 March, Duke of Gloucester and Duchess of Gloucester
 1954 - 7 February, Her Majesty The Queen, His Royal Highness the Duke of Edinburgh and the Earl of Wessex
 1958 - 23 February, Her Majesty Queen Elizabeth, Elizabeth, the Queen Mother
 1963 - 3 March, the Queen and the Duke of Edinburgh, on 175th Anniversary of the Foundation of Australia by Governor Philip in 1788
 1967 - 6 March, Princess Alexandra, on 150th Anniversary of the British and Foreign Bible Society in Australia
 1970 - 30 March, the Queen, the Duke of Edinburgh, Prince Charles and Princess Anne, on 200th Anniversary of Capt. James Cook's landing at Botany Bay
 1973 - 21 October, Queen Elizabeth II and Prince Philip, Duke of Edinburgh, after opening the Sydney Opera House the previous day
 1977 - 13 March, The Queen and the Duke of Edinburgh, on their Jubilee anniversary
 1977 - 7 September, Charles, Prince of Wales
 2006 - 13 March, The Queen and the Duke of Edinburgh, at the Commonwealth Day Observance in St Andrew's Cathedral

Heads of school 
The following individuals have served as Head of School or any precedent title:

Campuses 

St Andrew's Cathedral School resides across two dynamic city campuses in close proximity to Town Hall Station, St Andrew's House in Sydney Square and Bishop Barry Centre in Druitt Street.  It has a leasing arrangement with St Andrew's College within the grounds of The University of Sydney and the nearby Wentworth Park Sporting Complex. The school also uses the university's facilities for basketball, swimming, tennis and squash.

Gawura campus 

In a move resonating with Headmaster M. C. Newth's progressive multi-ethnic policy and introduction of Aboriginal and Torres Strait Islander boys into the school as far back as 1965, on 23 April 2007, the school opened a co-educational Kindergarten to Year 6 school for Aboriginal and Torres Strait Islander students, named "Gawura" (meaning "whale"), located in the Junior School and on the rooftop of St Andrew's House campus.  During the planning stage, the school searched twelve sites in the Redfern area to build the Gawura campus, but, facing opposition from some members of the Redfern community, it was decided the school should be set up within St Andrew's House. Gawura is Australia's first independent campus for Aboriginal children.

Students at Gawura study Gadigal, an Aboriginal language, and culture, NSW Board of Studies numeracy and literacy skills. All students are sponsored primarily by individual and family donors, corporates and foundations. Gawura was established in response to the disparity in educational outcomes of Indigenous and non-Indigenous children. Initially a part of St Andrew's Cathedral School, Gawura became a school in its own right in 2011.

Gawura offers full scholarships to local Aboriginal and Torres Strait Islander children who live at home with their families. Engagement of the Gawura families, parents and carers is critical to the success of the program. With up to 36 students, Gawura is a highly regarded "lighthouse" model for Indigenous education.

In 2020, Gawura was the winner of the prestigious Australian School of the Year Award for its success in achieving results well beyond the national average for Indigenous students and for providing exceptional cultural experiences that uphold and promote the dignity of First Nations' cultures.

House system 
St Andrew's Cathedral School contains eight houses, each named after an English cathedral or abbey with a choir school. The houses are: 
 Canterbury
 Durham
 Hereford
 St Paul's
 Salisbury
 Westminster
 Winchester
 York

The houses compete for the Dean Pitt Shield, awarded annually.

Uniform
The navy blue uniforms were designed to be similar to those worn by business people in the city, preparing the students for professional employment.

The boys' uniform consists of mid-grey trousers, white shirt (blue for Junior and Middle School), navy school blazer, black shoes and St Andrew's tie. House and sporting ties are also acceptable, and Year 12 students may wear their Year 12 ties.

The girls' uniform (winter) consists of the navy blazer, white shirt (blue with white collar for Junior and Middle School), navy skirt (navy tunic for junior school), navy stockings and black shoes. The summer uniform consists of a white, navy and blue dress, white socks, and black shoes for junior and middle school, and the winter uniform minus the stockings for senior college.

Cathedral choir 

The Cathedral Choir can trace its origins to the consecration of St. Andrew's Cathedral in 1868 and this establishes the choir as one of the oldest continuously active choirs in Australia. The choir comprises choristers and choral scholars from St Andrew's Cathedral School as well as a group of men, known as lay clerks, who sing the lower parts.

Through overseas tours and recordings St Andrew's Cathedral Choir has won an international reputation and has accepted invitations to deputise for the resident choirs in such places as St Paul's Cathedral, London, York Minster and many other important centres of Anglican worship. In 2002 the choristers appeared before HM the Queen at a Golden Jubilee concert in St. George's Chapel, Windsor Castle and also made a significant contribution to the ANZAC Day service in Westminster Abbey.

The Cathedral Choir has made several recordings.

During school terms the choir sings at the morning Sunday service at 10.30am and at Evensong on Thursdays at 5.30pm.

Michael Deasey completed a 24-year stint as the School's Master of the Choristers in 2005, and Ross Cobb, from the UK, was appointed as his successor.

To celebrate 140 years of the Cathedral Choir, the choir went on tour to England and Italy in July 2008. The first tour under the direction of Ross Cobb, the 11th organist and choirmaster of St Andrew's, the choir was invited to sing at services and concerts in some of Europe's most historic and significant buildings, including Wells Cathedral, Dedham and Harwich Parish Churches, Bath Abbey, Bristol Cathedral, All Soul's Langham Place, Christ Church Clifton, the Anglican churches of Venice and Florence, St Paul's Cathedral London and, for the first time, the Basilica of San Marco in Venice.

Co-curricular

Sport
The school has a compulsory winter sports program. Middle School and Senior College students can choose from over 20 different sports and activities ranging from rugby, netball, football and hockey to fencing, cross-country running, chess and ping pong. In summer, students compete in swimming, athletics, basketball, softball, water polo and cricket in the ISA competition. From 2014, the school also offers dance as a co-curricular activity at the school. The school also participates in a large number of sporting events not only within the school but also against other schools statewide, and occasionally outside the state.

Performing arts
St Andrew's provides extra-curricular opportunities in music, drama and performing arts.

Alongside its music curriculum, the school supports musical ensembles, student orchestral performances and domestic and international choral tours including to Europe, the United States and Asia. Extra-curricular drama activities include Senior and Middle School drama ensemble productions, an Old Andrean annual play, Theatresports and a weekly Year 7 Drama Club. The school has dedicated drama and performance spaces and a Black Box Theatre.

St Andrew's also has a lengthy history in musical production. The first whole of school musical was Oliver!, performed in 2001. Since then, a whole school musical production has been produced at least every two years. These have included:

 West Side Story (2003), performed at Sydney's Footbridge Theatre
 Godspell (2005), performed in St. Andrew's Cathedral
 Gilbert and Sullivan's The Pirates of Penzance (2006), performed at the Seymour Centre at the University of Sydney
 Les Misérables (2007), in the Chapter House adjoining St. Andrew's Cathedral
 Guys and Dolls (2008) performed at the Seymour Centre at the University of Sydney
 Paris (2009), performed at the Seymour Centre
 Children of Eden (2011), performed at NIDA's Parade Theatre 
 Beauty and the Beast (2013), performed at NIDA's Parade Theatre
 Peter Pan (2015), performed at Chatswood's Concourse Theatre
 The Wizard of Oz (2017), performed at NIDA's Parade Theatre
 Fiddler on the Roof (2019), performed at NIDA's Parade Theatre
 Annie (2022), performed at The Concourse Theatre, Chatswood

Outdoor education
St Andrew's offers an outdoor education program that includes year-group-based camping expeditions and outdoor activities. The school owns a property named Kirrikee, south-west of Sydney near Penrose, where the majority of their in-school outdoor education expeditions are conducted.

The school also offers more challenging optional overseas expeditions for older students. The Duke of Edinburgh's Award Scheme is offered to all students in Year 9 and above.

Mock trial
St Andrew's has had considerable success in the Mock Trial Competition, organised and operated by the Law Society of New South Wales, in which both government and independent schools throughout NSW participate. In 2004, the team were runners-up to Mereweather High School. In 2005, the school team of Year 11 students won the competition and then went on to compete in an International Mock Trial Competition against the UK National Mock Trial team, Ysgol Tre-Gib, Cardiff, United Kingdom, and once again was victorious.

Controversy 
In May 2015, former school mathematics teacher Robert Emmett was convicted on his guilty plea of possessing child abuse material and of aggravated filming of the private parts of a child under the age of 16 in 2013, for which he received an Intensive Corrections Order, a form of non-custodial sentence.

In November 2019, the female students of Year 12 were told to stay behind after a grade meeting. John Collier (then Headmaster) stated this was to address 'issues with uniform compliance.' Social media posts from the students state that they were told to kneel onto the floor to ensure the correct length of their skirts. Dr Collier (whom was absent in the uniform check) denied this, stating that 'one staff member knelt on the ground to show the girls how they could test the length of their skirts, with some students copying the staff member.' Dr Collier states that he had received emails both in support and disapproval of the uniform check. Due to the backlash received from this situation, Dr Collier issued an apology to the students and parents involved.

Old Andreans 
The Old Andreans' Association (OAA), which is the alumni organisation of St Andrew's Cathedral School, was established as the Old Boys' Union (OBU) by the school's third Headmaster, Percy Simpson, in 1906. The first president was the Hon Justice Webb, a judge of the Industrial Relations Commission of NSW. He held office for over 40 years.

The OAA has become an incorporated entity, and has improved its governance arrangements greatly. It continues to provide a means of maintaining contact between Old Andreans and their school.

Past and present members of the OAA (and OBU) include Sir Charles Kingsford Smith, Ken Tribe AC, Lt-Gen John Grey AC, Simon Tedeschi, John Antill, Julian Hamilton, Malcolm Page and Matt Levy.

Notable alumni

Aviation
 Sir Charles Kingsford Smith – pioneering aviator

Entertainment, media and the arts
 John Antill  – composer
 Rebecca Breeds – actress
 Nicholas Gledhill – film and stage actor
 Andrew Goodwin – international operatic tenor
 Julian Hamilton – one half of dance/electro duo The Presets
 Tim Harding – television celebrity
 Stuart Skelton – international operatic tenor
 Simon Tedeschi – pianist
 Professor Barry Tuckwell  – musician (horn)

Politics, public service and the law
 Jim Longley – former NSW Minister for Community Services, Minister for Aboriginal Affairs, and Minister for the Ageing (1993–1995)
 Richard Murden – Member of the NSW Legislative Assembly (Lib) (1953–1959)

Sports
 Matt Levy – Australian Paralympian swimmer
 Rod Macqueen – former Wallabies coach
 Abigail Paduch – judoka
 Malcolm Page – two-time Olympic gold medalist in sailing in the men's double-handed dinghy 470 in 2008 and 2012; flag-bearer for the 2012 London Olympics closing ceremony
 Warwick Selvey – Australian shot put and discus champion, Olympic athlete (1960, 1964); won the discus event at the 1962 Commonwealth Games in Perth
 Chelsea Pitman- netballer

See also

 List of Anglican schools in New South Wales
 Anglican education in Australia

References

External links 

 St Andrew's Cathedral School website
 St Andrew's Cathedral School - Gawura Campus
 St Andrew's Institute:CityEd
 St Andrew's Cathedral website
 St Andrew's Cathedral Choir website

Choir schools
Educational institutions established in 1885
1885 establishments in Australia
Sydney central business district
Junior School Heads Association of Australia Member Schools
Independent Schools Association (Australia)
International Baccalaureate schools in Australia
Anglican secondary schools in Sydney
Anglican primary schools in Sydney